Sulfina Barbu is a Romanian politician and member of the Chamber of Deputies.

Life 
A member of the Democratic Liberal Party (PDL), she was the President of the Women Organisation of the Democratic Liberal Party and a former Minister of Environment and Water Management in the Romanian Government between December 2004–April, 2007. She became Minister of Labour in September 2011.

External links 
 Official website of Sulfina Barbu

1967 births
Living people
Democratic Liberal Party (Romania) politicians
Members of the Chamber of Deputies (Romania)
Romanian Ministers of the Environment
Women members of the Romanian Cabinet
University of Bucharest alumni
21st-century Romanian women politicians
21st-century Romanian politicians